is a Spanish comic character created by cartoonist Francisco Ibáñez in 1964, protagonist of the series of the same name. Rompetechos is a short and myopic man whose poor vision generates comical situations. Ibánez has stated repeatedly that, among his creations, this is his favorite character  and due to this he appears frequently in other series of the same author, notably Mortadelo y Filemón (Mort and Phil).

Characteristics
Rompetechos is stubborn, short, short-sighted and clueless, his name ( means “ceiling breaker”) being an irony for his short height. The strips are 1 to 4 pages long and tell the life of this character and the funny situations that occur caused by his lack of vision.

The usual way of a cartoon of Rompetechos is usually as follows: The character has the need to do or buy something, so it starts to go back and forth causing many disasters because of his lack of vision that makes him confuse everything (e.g., confusing a young hairy man with a daisy and proceeding to "pluck" him or a man disguised as a Viking with a deer and trying to hunt him, etc.). If he tries to buy something he will invariably misread all the posters then will have a surreal dialogue with the store clerk. Rompetechos then mistreats the people he believes are laughing at him and then the situation escalates to physical violence or with Rompetechos locked in a jail or an asylum.

Creation
There are two conflicting stories about the creation of Rompetechos:

Francisco Ibáñez says that his boss, Francisco Bruguera, admired an actor called  and thus asked him to create a character named that. Ibáñez then created a character exactly the opposite of what his boss wanted. Supporting this version is the existence of a German film called , named in Spain  
Journalist and Mortadelo magazine editor Vicente Palomares says that the character is caricature of a staff writer named Ernesto Pérez Mas.

Another possible influence could have been Mr. Magoo.

Publication
The character first appeared in  magazine in 1964  In 1969 was the visible figure of   magazine as well as having two magazines named after him in the 1970s.

Adaptations
In the 2003  film , based on another characters of the author,  (Mort and Phil), Rompetechos is played by Emilio Gavira and is presented as a nostalgic of the Francoist regime, something not appearing in the comics. About this thing, director of the film, Javier Fesser, said: "a short guy with a mustache who is always angry has to be fascist". In the sequel, this Francoist connotations were suppressed.

Criticism
The character has been criticized by people who believe that mocks the myopic persons, but Ibáñez says that he has poor vision himself and does not pretend to do any harm.

References

Bibliography 
 DE LA CRUZ PÉREZ, Fernando Javier. Los cómics de Francisco Ibáñez. Ediciones de la Universidad de Castilla–La Mancha, Cuenca, 2008. 
 FERNÁNDEZ SOTO, Miguel. El mundo de Mortadelo y Filemón. Medialive Content, 2008. 
 GUIRAL, Antoni. El gran libro de Mortadelo y Filemón: 50 aniversario. Ediciones B.

External links 
 Entrada in Ediciones B web 
 Reseña in comicpasion.com 
 Personajes de tebeo 

1964 comics debuts
Fictional Spanish people
Comics characters introduced in 1964
Fictional blind characters
Spanish comics characters
Mort & Phil